The National Association of Government Contractors (NAGC) is a national trade association based in Washington, D.C., United States, for business owners engaged or interested in contracts with government, universities, and private corporations. NAGC was founded in 1957 and it has over 120,000 members.

See also
 Defense contractor
 Government procurement in the United States
 List of United States defense contractors
 Top 100 Contractors of the U.S. federal government

External links 
National Association of Government Contractors official website

Trade associations based in the United States
Government procurement in the United States
Organizations established in 1957
1957 establishments in the United States